Lieutenant-Colonel Augustus Berkeley, 4th Earl of Berkeley, KT (18 February 1715 – 9 January 1755) was the son of Vice-Admiral James Berkeley, 3rd Earl of Berkeley, and the former Lady Louisa Lennox.

Biography 
He was made an ensign in the 1st Regiment of Foot Guards in November 1734, and succeeded his father on 17 August 1736 as 4th Earl of Berkeley, 12th Baron Berkeley and 4th Viscount Dursley. In 1737, he was created Lord Lieutenant of Gloucestershire and Constable of St. Briavel's Castle, offices which he held until his death, and was made lieutenant-colonel of the 2nd Regiment of Foot Guards. On 9 June 1739, he was invested as a knight of the Order of the Thistle. In October of that same year, the Foundling Hospital received its royal charter, a charity for which Berkeley was a founding governor.

From 1738 until 1741, he was having a well-known relationship with the already married Frances Vane, Viscountess Vane. He married Elizabeth Drax, daughter of Henry Drax and Elizabeth Ernle, on 7 May 1744. They had at least three sons, including Frederick Augustus, 5th Earl of Berkeley and George Cranfield Berkeley, and a daughter, Elizabeth Craven. The earl died on 9 January 1755 and was buried on 17 January 1755 at Berkeley, Gloucestershire.  His wife, Elizabeth, was buried at St James's Church, Piccadilly, on 6 January 1777.

References

1716 births
1755 deaths
Grenadier Guards officers
104
Knights of the Thistle
Lord-Lieutenants of Gloucestershire
Augustus